Papyrus 16 (in the Gregory-Aland numbering), designated by 𝔓16, is an early copy of the New Testament in Greek. Originally, it may have been part of a papyrus manuscript of the Pauline Corpus of letters, but now only contains Philippians 3:10-17; 4:2-8. The manuscript has been paleographically assigned to the late 3rd century.

Description 

The manuscript is written in a documentary hand. There are about 37-38 lines per page. Grenfeld and Hunt conjectured that 𝔓15 and 𝔓16 might have been part of the same manuscript. Both manuscripts have the same formation of letters, line space, and punctuation.

The nomina sacra are written in an abbreviated way. The text was not corrected.

The Greek text of this codex is a representative of the Alexandrian text-type (rather proto-Alexandrian). Aland placed it in Category I. This manuscript diverges from the text of UBS4 8 times, from Codex Vaticanus 9 times, and from Codex Sinaiticus 10 times. P16 diverges from readings of the majority of all New Testament manuscripts 11 times.

It is currently housed at the Egyptian Museum (JE 47424) in Cairo.

See also 
 List of New Testament papyri
 Philippians 3; 4

References

Further reading

External links 
 P. Oxy. VII 1009

New Testament papyri
3rd-century biblical manuscripts
Early Greek manuscripts of the New Testament
Epistle to the Philippians papyri